The enzyme 1,4-lactonase (EC 3.1.1.25) catalyzes the generic reaction

a 1,4-lactone + H2O  a 4-hydroxyacid

This enzyme belongs to the family of hydrolases, specifically those acting on carboxylic ester bonds.  The systematic name is 1,4-lactone hydroxyacylhydrolase. It is also called γ-lactonase.  It participates in galactose metabolism and ascorbate and aldarate metabolism.  It employs one cofactor, Ca2+.

Structural studies

Applications 
In a study by Chen et al. a 1,4-lactonase was expressed in E. coli and used as a highly efficient biocatalyst for asymmetric synthesis of chiral compounds.

References

 
 

EC 3.1.1
Calcium enzymes
Enzymes of known structure